The Real Housewives is an international reality television franchise that consists of 11 installments in the United States, primarily broadcast on the television network Bravo and the streaming service Peacock, and 20 international installments, broadcast on various networks.

The American franchise began on March 21, 2006 with The Real Housewives of Orange County, and has expanded across New York City, Atlanta, New Jersey, D.C., Beverly Hills, Miami, Potomac, Dallas, Salt Lake City and Dubai.

As of June 2022, a total of 145 housewives have been featured on the American installments originated in the United States , several of whom have received spin-offs from their respective shows.

The American franchise has inspired many multiple shows across the world as international installments. The international franchise began in 2011 with The Real Housewives of Athens, and has expanded across Vancouver, Les Vraies Housewives, Melbourne, Cheshire, Auckland, Sydney, Toronto, Hungary, Johannesburg, di Napoli, Jersey, Durban, Slovenija: Vražje dame, Lagos and Cape Town.

As of January 2022, the international franchise is expected to branch out across the Gold Coast, Nairobi and Amsterdam.

As of March 2022, a total of 144 housewives have been featured across the international installments.

American installments

Several installments have featured cast members in a recurring capacity, referred to as "friends of the housewives." The first recurring cast member in the franchise was Jennifer Gilbert, introduced during the third season of The Real Housewives of New York City. Some cast members only ever appear on the series as friends; occasionally, friends are promoted to full-time cast members, and full-time cast members are reduced to friends.

Housewives who have been featured as friends either before or after being a full-time cast member include Vicki Gunvalson, Jeana Keough, Lauri Peterson and Lizzie Rovsek from Orange County; Luann de Lesseps and Heather Thomson from New York City; Marlo Hampton, Eva Marcille, Shereé Whitfield, Porsha Williams and Kim Zolciak-Biermann from Atlanta; Jacqueline Laurita, Danielle Staub, Kathy Wakile and Jackie Goldschneider from New Jersey; Brandi Glanville, Camille Grammer and Sutton Stracke from Beverly Hills; Adriana de Moura, Alexia Nepola, Marysol Patton and Ana Quincoces from Miami; Charisse Jackson-Jordan and Katie Rost from Potomac; and Cary Deuber from Dallas. Other women who have appeared in a recurring capacity across the franchise are listed below.

International installments

Please add cast members of Lagos, Cape Town, Bangkok, Amsterdam, Naples and Pretoria.

References

 
Real Housewives